Eymir (also Romanized as Eymīr; also known as Eymer) is a village in Qaleh Juq Rural District, Anguran District, Mahneshan County, Zanjan Province, Iran. At the 2006 census, its population was 143, in 32 families.

References 

Populated places in Mahneshan County